May We Borrow Your Husband? may refer to:

 May We Borrow Your Husband? (short story collection), a 1967 collection of short stories by Graham Greene
 May We Borrow Your Husband? (film), a 1986 British television movie